The Art Students League of New York is an art school at 215 West 57th Street in Manhattan, New York City, New York. The League has historically been known for its broad appeal to both amateurs and professional artists.

Although artists may study full-time, there have never been any degree programs or grades, and this informal attitude pervades the culture of the school. From the 19th century to the present, the League has counted among its attendees and instructors many historically important artists, and contributed to numerous influential schools and movements in the art world.

The League also maintains a significant permanent collection of student and faculty work, and publishes an online journal of writing on art-related topics, called LINEA. The journal's name refers to the school's motto Nulla Dies Sine Linea or "No Day Without a Line", traditionally attributed to the Greek painter Apelles by the historian Pliny the Elder, who recorded that Apelles would not let a day pass without at least drawing a line to practice his art.

History
Founded in 1875, the League's creation came about in response to both an anticipated gap in the program of the National Academy of Design's program of classes for that year, and to longer-term desires for more variety and flexibility in education for artists. The breakaway group of students included many women, and was originally housed in rented rooms at 16th Street and Fifth Avenue.

When the Academy resumed a more typical—but liberalized—program in 1877, there was some feeling that the League had served its purpose, but its students voted to continue its program, and it was incorporated the following year. Influential board members from this formative period included painter Thomas Eakins and sculptor Augustus Saint-Gaudens. Membership continued to increase, forcing the League to relocate to increasingly larger spaces.

The League participated in the founding of the American Fine Arts Society (AFAS) in 1889, together with the Society of American Artists and the Architectural League, among others. The American Fine Arts Building at 215 West 57th Street, constructed as their joint headquarters, has continued to house the League since 1892. Designed in the French Renaissance style by one of the founders of the AFAS, architect Henry Hardenbergh (in collaboration with W.C. Hunting & J.C. Jacobsen), the building is a designated New York City Landmark and is listed on the National Register of Historic Places.

In the late 1890s and early 1900s an increasing number of women artists came to study and work at the League many of them taking on key roles. Among them were Wilhelmina Weber Furlong and her husband Thomas Furlong. The avant-garde couple served the league in executive and administrative roles and as student members throughout the American modernism movement. Alice Van Vechten Brown, who would later develop some of the first art programs in American higher education, also studied with the league until prolonged family illness sent her home.

The painter Edith Dimock, a student from 1895 to 1899, described her classes at the Art Students League:

In his official biography, My Adventures as an Illustrator, Norman Rockwell recounts his time studying at the school as a young man, providing insight into its operation in the early 1900s.

The League's popularity persisted into the 1920s and 1930s under the hand of instructors like painter Thomas Hart Benton, who counted among his students there the young Jackson Pollock and other avant-garde artists who would rise to prominence in the 1940s.

Between 1942 and 1943, many of the League's students joined the armed forces to fight in World War II, and the League's enrollment decreased from 1,000 to 400, putting it in danger of closing in mid-1943. In response, five hundred artists donated $15,000, just enough to keep the League from closing. In the years after World War II, the G.I. Bill played an important role in the continuing history of the League by enabling returning veterans to attend classes. The League continued to be a formative influence on innovative artists, being an early stop in the careers of Abstract expressionists, Pop Artists and scores of others including Lee Bontecou, Helen Frankenthaler, Al Held, Eva Hesse, Roy Lichtenstein, Donald Judd, Knox Martin, Robert Rauschenberg, James Rosenquist, Cy Twombly and many others vitally active in the art world.

In 1968, Lisa M. Specht was elected first female president of the League. The League's unique importance in the larger art world dwindled somewhat during the 1960s, partially because of higher academia's emergence as an important presence in contemporary art education, and partially due to a shift in the art world towards minimalism, photography, conceptual art, and a more impersonal and indirect approach to art making.

, the League continues to attract a wide variety of young artists; and the focus on art made by hand, both figurative and abstract, remains strong; its continued significance has largely been in the continuation of its original mission – to give access to art classes and studio access to all comers, regardless of their means or technical background.

Other facilities
From 1906 until 1922, and again after the end of World War II from 1947 until 1979, the League operated a summer school of painting at Woodstock, New York. In 1995, the League's facilities expanded to include the Vytlacil campus in Sparkill, New York, named after and based upon a gift of the property and studio of former instructor Vaclav Vytlacil.

Notable instructors and lecturers

Since its inception, the Art Students League has employed notable professional artists as instructors and lecturers. Most engagements have been for a year or two, and some, like those of sculptor George Grey Barnard, were quite brief.

Others have taught for decades, notably: Frank DuMond and George Bridgman, who taught anatomy for artists and life drawing classes for some 45 years, reportedly to 70,000 students. Bridgman's successor was Robert Beverly Hale. Other longtime instructors included the painters Frank Mason (DuMond's successor, over 50 years), Kenneth Hayes Miller (40 years) from 1911 until 1951, sculptor Nathaniel Kaz (50 years), Peter Golfinopoulos (over 40 years), Knox Martin (over 45 years), Martha Bloom (30 years) and the sculptors William Zorach (30 years), and Jose De Creeft, Will Barnet (50 years) from the 1930s to the 1990s, and Bruce Dorfman, who is the longest continually-teaching instructor in the League's history (over 55 years).

Other well-known artists who have served as instructors include: 

 Lawrence Alloway
 Charles Alston
 Will Barnet
 Robert Beauchamp
 George Bellows
 Thomas Hart Benton, 
 Isabel Bishop
 Arnold Blanch
 Homer Boss
 Louis Bouche
 Robert Brackman
 George Bridgman
 Alexander Stirling Calder
 Naomi Andrée Campbell
 Robert Cenedella
 Jean Charlot
 William Merritt Chase
 Dionisio Cimarelli 
 Timothy J. Clark
 Walter Appleton Clark
 Kenyon Cox
 Jose De Creeft
 John Steuart Curry
 Stuart Davis
 Edwin Dickinson
 Sidney Dickinson
 Frederick Dielman
 Harvey Dinnerstein
 Arthur Wesley Dow
 Frank DuMond
 Frank Duveneck
 Thomas Eakins
 Daniel Chester French
 Dagmar Freuchen
 Wilhelmina Weber Furlong
 Michael Goldberg
 Stephen Greene
 George Grosz
 Molly Guion 
 Lena Gurr
 Philip Guston
 Robert Beverly Hale 
 Lovell Birge Harrison
 Ernest Haskell
 Childe Hassam
 Robert Henri
 Eva Hesse
 Charles Hinman
 Hans Hofmann
 Harry Holtzman
 Jamal Igle
 Burt Johnson
 Wolf Kahn
 Morris Kantor
 Rockwell Kent
 Walt Kuhn
 Yasuo Kuniyoshi
 Gabriel Laderman
 Ronnie Landfield
 Jacob Lawrence
 Hayley Lever
 Martin Lewis
 James Little
 George Luks
 Paul Manship
 Reginald Marsh
 Fletcher Martin
 Knox Martin
 Jan Matulka
 Earl Mayan
 Mary Beth Mckenzie
 William Charles McNulty
 Willard Metcalf
 Kenneth Hayes Miller
 Fred Mitchell
 F. Luis Mora
 Robert Neffson
 Kimon Nicolaïdes
 Maxfield Parrish
 Jules Pascin
 Joseph Pennell
 Richard C. Pionk
 Larry Poons
 Richard Pousette-Dart
 Abraham Rattner
 Peter Reginato
 Frank J. Reilly
 Henry Reuterdahl
 Boardman Robinson
 Augustus Saint-Gaudens
 Kikuo Saito
 Nelson Shanks
 William Scharf
 Susan Louise Shatter
 Walter Shirlaw
 John Sloan
 Hughie Lee-Smith
 Isaac Soyer
 Raphael Soyer
 Theodoros Stamos
 Anita Steckel
 Harry Sternberg
 Augustus Vincent Tack
 George Tooker
 John Henry Twachtman
 Vaclav Vytlacil
 Max Weber
 J. Alden Weir
 Jerry Weiss
 William Zorach

Notable alumni

The list of Art Students League of New York alumni includes:

 Pacita Abad
 Harry N. Abrams
 Edwin Tappan Adney
 Olga Albizu
 Karin von Aroldingen
 Ai Weiwei
 Gladys Aller
 William Anthony
 Edmund Archer
 Nela Arias-Misson
 David Attie
 Milton Avery
 Elizabeth Gowdy Baker
 Thomas R. Ball
 Hugo Ballin
 Will Barnet
 Nancy Hemenway Barton
 Saul Bass
 C. C. Beall
 Romare Bearden
 Tony Bennett
 Theresa Bernstein
 Brother Thomas Bezanson
 Thomas Hart Benton
 Ilse Bischoff
 Isabel Bishop
 Dorothy Block
 Leonard Bocour
 Harriet Bogart
 Abraham Bogdanove
 Lee Bontecou
 Henry Botkin
 Louise Bourgeois
 Harry Bowden
 Stanley Boxer
 Louise Brann
 D. Putnam Brinley
 James Brooks
 Carmen L. Browne
 Jennie Augusta Brownscombe
 Edith Bry
 Dennis Miller Bunker
 Jacob Burck
 Feliza Bursztyn
 Theodore Earl Butler
 Paul Cadmus
 Alexander Calder
 Chris Campbell
 John F. Carlson
 Kathrin Cawein
 Robert Cenedella
 Paul Chalfin
 Ching Ho Cheng
 Minna Citron
 Margaret Covey Chisholm
 Walter Appleton Clark
 Kate Freeman Clark
 Henry Ives Cobb, Jr.
 Claudette Colbert
 Willie Cole
 John Connell
 Russell Cowles
 Allyn Cox
 Ellis Credle
 Richard V. Culter
 Mel Cummin
 Frederick Stuart Church
 Joan Danziger
 Andrew Dasburg
 Charles C. Dawson
 Adolf Dehn
 Dorothy Dehner
 Sidney Dickinson
 Burgoyne Diller
 Ellen Eagle
 Marjorie Eaton
 Sir Jacob Epstein
 Marisol Escobar
 Joe Eula
 Philip Evergood
 Peter Falk
 Frances Farrand Dodge
 Ernest Fiene
 Irving Fierstein
 Louis Finkelstein
 Ethel Fisher
 Wilhelmina Weber Furlong
 Helen Frankenthaler
 Frederick Carl Frieseke
 Wanda Gág
 Dan Gheno
 Charles Dana Gibson
 William Glackens
 Elias Goldberg
 Michael Goldberg
 Shirley Goldfarb
 Peter Golfinopoulos
 Adolph Gottlieb
 Blanche Grambs
 John D. Graham
 Enrique Grau
 Nancy Graves
 Clement Greenberg
 Stephen Greene
 Red Grooms
 Chaim Gross
 Lena Gurr
 Bessie Pease Gutmann
 Minna Harkavy
 Marsden Hartley
 Julius Hatofsky
 Ethel Hays
 Gus Heinze
 Al Held
 Carmen Herrera
 Eva Hesse
 Al Hirschfeld
 Itshak Holtz
 Lorenzo Homar
 Winslow Homer
 Thomas Hoving
 Paul Jenkins
 Burt Johnson
 Donald Judd
 Joan Kahn
 Matsumi Kanemitsu
 Alonzo Myron Kimball
 Torleif S. Knaphus
 Belle Kogan
 Lee Krasner
 Anne Kutka (McCosh)
 Ronnie Landfield
 Adelaide Lawson
 Arthur Lee
 Lucy L'Engle
 Alfred Leslie
 Roy Lichtenstein
 Dorothy Loeb
 Tom Loepp
 Michael Loew
 John Marin
 Reginald Marsh
 Knox Martin
 Donald Martiny
 Mercedes Matter
 Louisa Matthiasdottir
 Peter Max
 John Alan Maxwell
 Roderick Fletcher Mead
 Felicia Meyer
 Eleanore Mikus
 Emil Milan
 Lee Miller
 David Milne
 F. Luis Mora
 Walter Tandy Murch
 Reuben Nakian
 Louise Nevelson
 Barnett Newman
 Isamu Noguchi
 Sassona Norton
 Frank O'Connor
 Georgia O'Keeffe
 Mary Orwen
 Roselle Osk
 Tom Otterness
 Betty Waldo Parish
 Clara Weaver Parrish
 Betty Parsons
 David Partridge
 Phillip Pavia,
 Roger Tory Peterson
 Bert Geer Phillips
 I. Rice Pereira
 Alain J. Picard
 Jackson Pollock
 Fairfield Porter
 Edith Mitchill Prellwitz
 Henry Prellwitz
 Robert Rauschenberg
 Man Ray
 Charles M. Relyea
 Frederic Remington
 Priscilla Roberts
 Norman Rockwell
 Esther Rolick
 Louise Emerson Ronnebeck
 Herman Rose
 Leonard Rosenfeld
 James Rosenquist
 Sanford Ross
 Mark Rothko
 Glen Rounds
 Luis Alvarez Roure
 Peter Rubino
 Morgan Russell
 Abbey Ryan
 Sam Savitt
 Concetta Scaravaglione
 Louis Schanker
 Mary Schepisi
 Katherine Schmidt
 Emily Maria Scott
 Ethel Schwabacher
 Joan Semmel
 Maurice Sendak
 Ben Shahn
 Nelson Shanks
 Nat Mayer Shapiro
 Henrietta Shore
 Jessamine Shumate
 David Smith
 Tony Smith
 Vincent D. Smith
 Robert Smithson
 Louise Hammond Willis Snead
 Armstrong Sperry
 Otto Stark
 William Starkweather
 Frank Stella
 Joseph Stella
 Inga Stephens Pratt Clark
 Harry Sternberg
 Clyfford Still
 Soichi Sunami
 Katharine Lamb Tait
 Minerva Teichert
 Val Telberg
 Patty Prather Thum
 George Tooker
 Kim Tschang-yeul
 Wen-Ying Tsai
 Luce Turnier
 Cy Twombly
 Jack Tworkov
 Edward Charles Volkert
 Emmett Watson
 Nan Watson
 Alonzo C. Webb
 Sybilla Mittell Weber
 Davyd Whaley
 Gertrude Vanderbilt Whitney
 Adolph Alexander Weinman
 J. Alden Weir
 Jerry Weiss
 Stow Wengenroth
 Pennerton West
 Anita Willets-Burnham
 Ellen Axson Wilson
 Gahan Wilson
 Louise Waterman Wise
 Sarah A. Worden
 Alice Morgan Wright
 Russel Wright
 Art Young
 Marie Zimmermann
 Philip Zuchman
 Iván Zulueta

See also
National Academy of Design
Society of American Artists
Ten American Painters
List of art schools
Atelier Method

References

Further reading
McElhinney James L: Art Students League of New York on Painting: Lessons and Meditations on Mediums, Styles, and Methods, 2015.

External links

Art Students League of New York
"Brief History of The League's Early Years"
Linea
PBS American Masters documentation including some notable alumni
Information on the ASL at the Traditional Fine Arts Organization web site, retrieved December 14, 2007
"Linea, Journal of the Art Students League of New York" available for download in PDF form; four issues per year (free)
"On the Front Lines: Military Veterans at The Art Students League of New York"
Art Students League records, 1875-1955 from the Smithsonian Archives of American Art

 
Art schools in New York City
American artist groups and collectives
Arts organizations based in New York City
 
Culture of Manhattan
Education in New York City
Modern art
Arts organizations established in the 1870s
Educational institutions established in 1875
1875 establishments in New York (state)
Cultural history of the United States